Leroy Goff (born 19 June 1946) is a Filipino former swimmer. He competed in five events at the 1968 Summer Olympics.

References

1946 births
Living people
Filipino male swimmers
Olympic swimmers of the Philippines
Swimmers at the 1968 Summer Olympics
People from Sulu
Asian Games medalists in swimming
Asian Games silver medalists for the Philippines
Asian Games bronze medalists for the Philippines
Swimmers at the 1966 Asian Games
Swimmers at the 1970 Asian Games
Medalists at the 1966 Asian Games
Medalists at the 1970 Asian Games
20th-century Filipino people
21st-century Filipino people